The 2003–04 Ottawa Senators season was the 12th season of the Ottawa Senators of the National Hockey League (NHL). This season would see the Senators again finish with over 100 points, finishing with 102, but this was good for only third in the tightly-contested division, as the Boston Bruins would have 104 and the Toronto Maple Leafs 103. Ottawa would meet Toronto in the first-round of the playoffs for the fourth time, where the Maple Leafs would win the series 4–3 to end the Senators' playoff hopes. Ottawa would fire Head Coach Jacques Martin after the playoff round.

Offseason
On June 21, 2003, Assistant Coach Roger Neilson died after four years of battling cancer. The Senators would wear a patch on their jerseys with an illustration of his signature and a necktie. Neilson would often wear distinctive neckties and the necktie became associated with him, and also became the symbol for "Roger's House", a residence for the use of families with a family member fighting cancer while in hospital, established by him and the Senators.

On August 26, 2003, Eugene Melnyk purchased the club to bring financial stability.

Regular season
Marian Hossa lead the club in scoring with 82 points, good enough for sixth overall in the NHL.

Highlights
On February 5, 2004, the Senators were playing the Toronto Maple Leafs and were leading 4–0 in the second period. The flu started affecting players on the Senators leading the team to be down to only 15 skaters by the end of the game. The Maple Leafs took full advantage and won the game 5–4 in overtime.

On March 5, 2004, in a game against the Philadelphia Flyers, a record was set for the most penalty minutes in a game by both teams, at 419 minutes. Five brawls broke out in the last two minutes of the game. It took the officials until 90 minutes after the game was over to sort out the penalties. By the end of the game, Philadelphia had 213 penalty minutes and seven men left on the bench, while Ottawa finished with 206 penalty minutes and six men left.

The Senators finished the regular season first overall in the NHL in scoring (262 goals for), power-play goals scored (80) and power-play percentage (21.62%).

Final standings

Playoffs
In the first round of the 2004 playoffs, the Senators would lose again to the Maple Leafs for the fourth straight time. By now, Ottawa had developed a strong rivalry with their Ontario cousins and there was a great deal of pressure on the team to finally defeat the Leafs. Two days after the Senators' loss, Head Coach Jacques Martin was fired, and goaltender Patrick Lalime was later traded to the St. Louis Blues.

Martin had been coach of the Senators for eight-and-a-half years. He was well respected, earned a 341–255–96 regular season record with the Senators, had led the team to eight consecutive playoff appearances and was widely credited with changing the team into an elite NHL franchise. He also won the Jack Adams Trophy as Coach of the Year in 1999. However, after losing eight of 12 playoff series, including all four series in five years against the rival Toronto Maple Leafs, Senators ownership felt that a new coach was required for playoff success.

Schedule and results

Regular season

|- align="center" bgcolor="#CCFFCC"
|1||W||October 9, 2003||5–2 || align="left"|  Montreal Canadiens (2003–04) ||1–0–0–0||18,500 || 
|- align="center" bgcolor="#FF6F6F"
|2||OTL||October 11, 2003||2–3 OT|| align="left"|  Detroit Red Wings (2003–04) ||1–0–0–1||18,500 || 
|- align="center" bgcolor="#FFBBBB"
|3||L||October 15, 2003||3–4 || align="left"| @ Los Angeles Kings (2003–04) ||1–1–0–1||18,180 || 
|- align="center" bgcolor="#CCFFCC"
|4||W||October 17, 2003||3–0 || align="left"| @ Mighty Ducks of Anaheim (2003–04) ||2–1–0–1||13,885 || 
|- align="center" bgcolor="#CCFFCC"
|5||W||October 18, 2003||4–1 || align="left"| @ San Jose Sharks (2003–04) ||3–1–0–1||14,807 || 
|- align="center" bgcolor="#CCFFCC"
|6||W||October 23, 2003||5–1 || align="left"|  Washington Capitals (2003–04) ||4–1–0–1||18,188 || 
|- align="center" bgcolor="#CCFFCC"
|7||W||October 25, 2003||6–2 || align="left"| @ Montreal Canadiens (2003–04) ||5–1–0–1||21,273 || 
|- align="center" bgcolor="#FFBBBB"
|8||L||October 30, 2003||2–3 || align="left"|  Florida Panthers (2003–04) ||5–2–0–1||17,086 || 
|-

|- align="center"
|9||T||November 1, 2003||1–1 OT|| align="left"|  Buffalo Sabres (2003–04) ||5–2–1–1||15,445 || 
|- align="center" bgcolor="#FFBBBB"
|10||L||November 3, 2003||3–6 || align="left"| @ New York Islanders (2003–04) ||5–3–1–1||10,957 || 
|- align="center"
|11||T||November 6, 2003||3–3 OT|| align="left"|  Edmonton Oilers (2003–04) ||5–3–2–1||15,216 || 
|- align="center" bgcolor="#FFBBBB"
|12||L||November 8, 2003||0–1 || align="left"|  New Jersey Devils (2003–04) ||5–4–2–1||18,359 || 
|- align="center" bgcolor="#CCFFCC"
|13||W||November 11, 2003||5–3 || align="left"| @ Atlanta Thrashers (2003–04) ||6–4–2–1||13,547 || 
|- align="center" bgcolor="#CCFFCC"
|14||W||November 13, 2003||5–2 || align="left"|  Columbus Blue Jackets (2003–04) ||7–4–2–1||15,297 || 
|- align="center" bgcolor="#FFBBBB"
|15||L||November 15, 2003||2–3 || align="left"|  Montreal Canadiens (2003–04) ||7–5–2–1||18,337 || 
|- align="center" bgcolor="#FFBBBB"
|16||L||November 17, 2003||1–2 || align="left"|  Buffalo Sabres (2003–04) ||7–6–2–1||15,744 || 
|- align="center" bgcolor="#CCFFCC"
|17||W||November 20, 2003||6–1 || align="left"|  Carolina Hurricanes (2003–04) ||8–6–2–1||17,159 || 
|- align="center" bgcolor="#FF6F6F"
|18||OTL||November 22, 2003||1–2 OT|| align="left"| @ Pittsburgh Penguins (2003–04) ||8–6–2–2||11,233 || 
|- align="center" bgcolor="#FFBBBB"
|19||L||November 23, 2003||2–6 || align="left"| @ New York Rangers (2003–04) ||8–7–2–2||18,200 || 
|- align="center" bgcolor="#CCFFCC"
|20||W||November 25, 2003||6–3 || align="left"| @ Atlanta Thrashers (2003–04) ||9–7–2–2||11,937 || 
|- align="center" bgcolor="#FF6F6F"
|21||OTL||November 27, 2003||2–3 OT|| align="left"|  Vancouver Canucks (2003–04) ||9–7–2–3||18,500 || 
|- align="center" bgcolor="#FFBBBB"
|22||L||November 29, 2003||1–2 || align="left"|  Toronto Maple Leafs (2003–04) ||9–8–2–3||18,500 || 
|-

|- align="center" bgcolor="#CCFFCC"
|23||W||December 1, 2003||4–1 || align="left"|  Philadelphia Flyers (2003–04) ||10–8–2–3||16,289 || 
|- align="center" bgcolor="#CCFFCC"
|24||W||December 3, 2003||4–0 || align="left"| @ Florida Panthers (2003–04) ||11–8–2–3||11,520 || 
|- align="center" bgcolor="#CCFFCC"
|25||W||December 4, 2003||4–1 || align="left"| @ Tampa Bay Lightning (2003–04) ||12–8–2–3||15,221 || 
|- align="center" bgcolor="#FFBBBB"
|26||L||December 6, 2003||1–2 || align="left"|  New Jersey Devils (2003–04) ||12–9–2–3||17,931 || 
|- align="center"
|27||T||December 8, 2003||2–2 OT|| align="left"| @ Boston Bruins (2003–04) ||12–9–3–3||10,662 || 
|- align="center" bgcolor="#CCFFCC"
|28||W||December 11, 2003||3–2 || align="left"|  Tampa Bay Lightning (2003–04) ||13–9–3–3||17,256 || 
|- align="center" bgcolor="#FFBBBB"
|29||L||December 13, 2003||2–3 || align="left"|  Boston Bruins (2003–04) ||13–10–3–3||17,671 || 
|- align="center" bgcolor="#CCFFCC"
|30||W||December 18, 2003||6–1 || align="left"|  Chicago Blackhawks (2003–04) ||14–10–3–3||16,420 || 
|- align="center" bgcolor="#CCFFCC"
|31||W||December 20, 2003||3–1 || align="left"|  New York Rangers (2003–04) ||15–10–3–3||18,037 || 
|- align="center" bgcolor="#CCFFCC"
|32||W||December 22, 2003||3–2 OT|| align="left"|  Florida Panthers (2003–04) ||16–10–3–3||17,189 || 
|- align="center"
|33||T||December 23, 2003||2–2 OT|| align="left"| @ Buffalo Sabres (2003–04) ||16–10–4–3||15,317 || 
|- align="center"
|34||T||December 26, 2003||3–3 OT|| align="left"|  Pittsburgh Penguins (2003–04) ||16–10–5–3||18,316 || 
|- align="center" bgcolor="#CCFFCC"
|35||W||December 28, 2003||5–2 || align="left"|  Atlanta Thrashers (2003–04) ||17–10–5–3||18,500 || 
|- align="center" bgcolor="#CCFFCC"
|36||W||December 30, 2003||3–0 || align="left"| @ Boston Bruins (2003–04) ||18–10–5–3||16,388 || 
|-

|- align="center" bgcolor="#CCFFCC"
|37||W||January 1, 2004||1–0 || align="left"|  New York Islanders (2003–04) ||19–10–5–3||18,500 || 
|- align="center" bgcolor="#CCFFCC"
|38||W||January 3, 2004||5–2 || align="left"|  Washington Capitals (2003–04) ||20–10–5–3||17,695 || 
|- align="center" bgcolor="#CCFFCC"
|39||W||January 6, 2004||5–2 || align="left"|  Tampa Bay Lightning (2003–04) ||21–10–5–3||16,890 || 
|- align="center" bgcolor="#CCFFCC"
|40||W||January 8, 2004||7–1 || align="left"| @ Toronto Maple Leafs (2003–04) ||22–10–5–3||19,395 || 
|- align="center" bgcolor="#FFBBBB"
|41||L||January 9, 2004||2–3 || align="left"| @ Buffalo Sabres (2003–04) ||22–11–5–3||18,690 || 
|- align="center"
|42||T||January 11, 2004||2–2 OT|| align="left"| @ Carolina Hurricanes (2003–04) ||22–11–6–3||9,350 || 
|- align="center" bgcolor="#CCFFCC"
|43||W||January 13, 2004||4–0 || align="left"| @ New Jersey Devils (2003–04) ||23–11–6–3||11,456 || 
|- align="center"
|44||T||January 15, 2004||4–4 OT|| align="left"|  New York Islanders (2003–04) ||23–11–7–3||17,197 || 
|- align="center" bgcolor="#CCFFCC"
|45||W||January 17, 2004||4–0 || align="left"|  Boston Bruins (2003–04) ||24–11–7–3||18,500 || 
|- align="center" bgcolor="#FFBBBB"
|46||L||January 19, 2004||2–5 || align="left"| @ New York Islanders (2003–04) ||24–12–7–3||14,213 || 
|- align="center" bgcolor="#CCFFCC"
|47||W||January 20, 2004||3–1 || align="left"| @ Carolina Hurricanes (2003–04) ||25–12–7–3||8,810 || 
|- align="center" bgcolor="#CCFFCC"
|48||W||January 22, 2004||6–5 || align="left"|  Pittsburgh Penguins (2003–04) ||26–12–7–3||16,777 || 
|- align="center" bgcolor="#CCFFCC"
|49||W||January 24, 2004||9–1 || align="left"|  New York Rangers (2003–04) ||27–12–7–3||18,500 || 
|- align="center" bgcolor="#FFBBBB"
|50||L||January 28, 2004||3–5 || align="left"| @ Dallas Stars (2003–04) ||27–13–7–3||18,006 || 
|- align="center" bgcolor="#CCFFCC"
|51||W||January 29, 2004||4–1 || align="left"| @ Phoenix Coyotes (2003–04) ||28–13–7–3||13,387 || 
|- align="center" bgcolor="#FFBBBB"
|52||L||January 31, 2004||1–5 || align="left"| @ Toronto Maple Leafs (2003–04) ||28–14–7–3||19,419 || 
|-

|- align="center" bgcolor="#FFBBBB"
|53||L||February 3, 2004||1–2 || align="left"| @ New Jersey Devils (2003–04) ||28–15–7–3||12,304 || 
|- align="center" bgcolor="#FF6F6F"
|54||OTL||February 5, 2004||4–5 OT|| align="left"|  Toronto Maple Leafs (2003–04) ||28–15–7–4||18,500 || 
|- align="center" bgcolor="#CCFFCC"
|55||W||February 10, 2004||3–1 || align="left"|  St. Louis Blues (2003–04) ||29–15–7–4||18,238 || 
|- align="center" bgcolor="#CCFFCC"
|56||W||February 12, 2004||3–2 OT|| align="left"|  Boston Bruins (2003–04) ||30–15–7–4||18,364 || 
|- align="center" bgcolor="#CCFFCC"
|57||W||February 14, 2004||5–2 || align="left"|  Montreal Canadiens (2003–04) ||31–15–7–4||18,500 || 
|- align="center" bgcolor="#CCFFCC"
|58||W||February 16, 2004||4–1 || align="left"| @ New York Rangers (2003–04) ||32–15–7–4||18,200 || 
|- align="center"
|59||T||February 17, 2004||1–1 OT|| align="left"| @ Washington Capitals (2003–04) ||32–15–8–4||13,901 || 
|- align="center" bgcolor="#FF6F6F"
|60||OTL||February 19, 2004||2–3 OT|| align="left"|  Atlanta Thrashers (2003–04) ||32–15–8–5||18,500 || 
|- align="center" bgcolor="#CCFFCC"
|61||W||February 21, 2004||2–1 || align="left"|  Calgary Flames (2003–04) ||33–15–8–5||18,500 || 
|- align="center" bgcolor="#CCFFCC"
|62||W||February 22, 2004||6–3 || align="left"| @ Pittsburgh Penguins (2003–04) ||34–15–8–5||11,780 || 
|- align="center" bgcolor="#FFBBBB"
|63||L||February 24, 2004||2–4 || align="left"| @ Montreal Canadiens (2003–04) ||34–16–8–5||21,273 || 
|- align="center"
|64||T||February 26, 2004||1–1 OT|| align="left"|  Philadelphia Flyers (2003–04) ||34–16–9–5||18,500 || 
|- align="center" bgcolor="#CCFFCC"
|65||W||February 28, 2004||7–1 || align="left"|  Buffalo Sabres (2003–04) ||35–16–9–5||18,500 || 
|-

|- align="center" bgcolor="#FFBBBB"
|66||L||March 3, 2004||3–4 || align="left"| @ Buffalo Sabres (2003–04) ||35–17–9–5||11,956 || 
|- align="center" bgcolor="#FFBBBB"
|67||L||March 5, 2004||3–5 || align="left"| @ Philadelphia Flyers (2003–04) ||35–18–9–5||19,539 || 
|- align="center" bgcolor="#CCFFCC"
|68||W||March 6, 2004||4–2 || align="left"|  Nashville Predators (2003–04) ||36–18–9–5||18,500 || 
|- align="center" bgcolor="#CCFFCC"
|69||W||March 8, 2004||4–1 || align="left"| @ Washington Capitals (2003–04) ||37–18–9–5||17,776 || 
|- align="center" bgcolor="#FFBBBB"
|70||L||March 11, 2004||2–4 || align="left"| @ Calgary Flames (2003–04) ||37–19–9–5||17,869 || 
|- align="center" bgcolor="#CCFFCC"
|71||W||March 13, 2004||2–1 || align="left"| @ Vancouver Canucks (2003–04) ||38–19–9–5||18,630 || 
|- align="center" bgcolor="#FFBBBB"
|72||L||March 14, 2004||1–3 || align="left"| @ Edmonton Oilers (2003–04) ||38–20–9–5||16,839 || 
|- align="center" bgcolor="#FFBBBB"
|73||L||March 16, 2004||2–5 || align="left"| @ Minnesota Wild (2003–04) ||38–21–9–5||18,568 || 
|- align="center" bgcolor="#CCFFCC"
|74||W||March 18, 2004||2–0 || align="left"|  Colorado Avalanche (2003–04) ||39–21–9–5||18,500 || 
|- align="center" bgcolor="#FF6F6F"
|75||OTL||March 20, 2004||2–3 OT|| align="left"|  Carolina Hurricanes (2003–04) ||39–21–9–6||18,500 || 
|- align="center" bgcolor="#FFBBBB"
|76||L||March 23, 2004||2–4 || align="left"| @ Boston Bruins (2003–04) ||39–22–9–6||15,887 || 
|- align="center" bgcolor="#CCFFCC"
|77||W||March 25, 2004||4–0 || align="left"| @ Montreal Canadiens (2003–04) ||40–22–9–6||21,273 || 
|- align="center"
|78||T||March 27, 2004||2–2 OT|| align="left"| @ Toronto Maple Leafs (2003–04) ||40–22–10–6||19,480 || 
|- align="center" bgcolor="#CCFFCC"
|79||W||March 29, 2004||5–4 OT|| align="left"| @ Tampa Bay Lightning (2003–04) ||41–22–10–6||19,844 || 
|- align="center" bgcolor="#CCFFCC"
|80||W||March 31, 2004||5–4 || align="left"| @ Florida Panthers (2003–04) ||42–22–10–6||15,876 || 
|-

|- align="center" bgcolor="#CCFFCC"
|81||W||April 2, 2004||3–1 || align="left"| @ Philadelphia Flyers (2003–04) ||43–22–10–6||19,776 || 
|- align="center" bgcolor="#FFBBBB"
|82||L||April 3, 2004||0–6 || align="left"|  Toronto Maple Leafs (2003–04) ||43–23–10–6||18,500 || 
|-

|-
| Legend:

Playoffs

|- align="center" bgcolor="#CCFFCC"
|1|| April 8 || Ottawa || 4–2 || Toronto || || 19,535 || Senators lead 1–0 || 
|- align="center" bgcolor="#FFBBBB"
|2|| April 10 || Ottawa || 0–2 ||  Toronto || || 19,529 || Series tied 1–1 || 
|- align="center" bgcolor="#FFBBBB"
|3|| April 12 || Toronto || 2–0 || Ottawa || || 18,500 || Maple Leafs lead 2–1 || 
|- align="center" bgcolor="#CCFFCC"
|4|| April 14 || Toronto || 1–4 ||  Ottawa || || 18,500 || Series tied 2–2 || 
|- align="center" bgcolor="#FFBBBB"
|5|| April 16 || Ottawa || 0–2 || Toronto || || 19,584 || Maple Leafs lead 3–2 || 
|- align="center" bgcolor="#CCFFCC"
|6|| April 18 || Toronto || 1–2 ||  Ottawa || 2OT || 18,500 || Series tied 3–3 || 
|- align="center" bgcolor="#FFBBBB"
|7|| April 20 || Ottawa || 1–4 || Toronto || || 19,646 || Maple Leafs win 4–3 || 
|-

|-
| Legend:

Player statistics

Scoring
 Position abbreviations: C = Centre; D = Defence; G = Goaltender; LW = Left Wing; RW = Right Wing
  = Joined team via a transaction (e.g., trade, waivers, signing) during the season. Stats reflect time with the Senators only.
  = Left team via a transaction (e.g., trade, waivers, release) during the season. Stats reflect time with the Senators only.

Goaltending

Awards and records

Awards

Transactions
The Senators were involved in the following transactions from June 10, 2003, the day after the deciding game of the 2003 Stanley Cup Finals, through June 7, 2004, the day of the deciding game of the 2004 Stanley Cup Finals.

Trades

Players acquired

Players lost

Signings

Draft picks
Ottawa's draft picks from the 2003 NHL Entry Draft held on June 21 and June 22, 2003 at the Gaylord Entertainment Center in Nashville, Tennessee.

Farm teams
 Binghamton Senators (American Hockey League)

See also
 2003–04 NHL season

Notes

References

 
 
 

Ottawa Senators seasons
Ottawa Senators season
Ottawa